The Habima Theatre ( Te'atron HaBima, lit. "The Stage Theatre") is the national theatre of Israel and one of the first Hebrew language theatres. It is located in Habima Square in the center of Tel Aviv.

History
 

Menahem Gnessin was one of its cofounders and early actors. Because its performances were in Hebrew, invoked the Jewish folk tradition, and dealt with issues of the Jewish people, soon it was banned by Russian authorities, and the theatre troupe was forced to become a travelling one. Beginning in 1918, the theatre operated under the auspices of the Moscow Art Theatre, which some consider its actual beginning. It encountered difficulties under the Soviet government as well, after the Russian Revolution. Konstantin Stanislavsky arranged for the mainly Jewish Polish actors to be trained by Yevgeny Vakhtangov. The People's Commissar for Nationalities Affairs, Joseph Stalin, also authorized the theatre's creation. However, the Yevsektsiya attempted to use its influence to cut off state funds to Habima, branding it counter-revolutionary.

International tour
In 1926, the theatre left the Soviet Union to tour abroad, in countries including Latvia, Lithuania, Poland, France, Germany, the Netherlands, and the United States. Their productions met with great success. In 1927, the company split up, with Zemach and some of the actors choosing to stay in the U.S.

Lodz Impact
The theatre staff visited the city of Lodz, and the pre-war photographer and artist Mendel Grossman, photographed the actors and actresses from the wings of the stage. His life was changed as a result of the visit of the theatre.

Establishment in Palestine

Other members of the theatre took the company to Mandate Palestine in 1928.  In the 1928–29 season there, the Habima Players presented two plays, both under the direction of Aleksei Dikiy, from the Moscow Art Theatre. The first production, Ha-otsar (The Treasure), a translation of Sholem Aleichem's Yiddish play Der Oytser, premiered on December 29, 1928.  The second production, which premiered on May 23, 1929, in Tel Aviv, was Keter David (David's Crown), an adaptation by Hebrew writer Isaac Lamdan of The Hair of Absalom (Los cabellos de Absalón), by the 17th-century Spanish dramatist Calderón.

In 1930 the company traveled to Berlin, Germany, where it produced Shakespeare's Twelfth Night, directed by Michael Chekhov, and Karl Gutzkow's Uriel Acosta, under the direction of Alexander Granovski.

The company finally settled in Palestine in 1931. In 1945, it built a theatre in Tel Aviv, which it occupied before completion.

National Theatre of Israel
Habima has been officially considered the national theatre of Israel since 1958, the year in which it received the Israel Prize for theatre.  This was the first year in which the Prize was awarded to an organization. In the 21st century, Habima employs 80 actors, and another 120 staff members work at the complex.

Restoration 

In January 2012, the theatre reopened after four and a half years of renovations. Architect Ram Karmi was commissioned to redesign the historic building. More than NIS 100 million was invested in the makeover, which has added 500 square meters of floor space and three new rehearsal rooms. The building's four auditoriums were completely rebuilt. Each is a different size and color: Rovina is blue and seats 930 people; Meskin is lavender and seats 320; Bertonov (also known as Bamartef) is green and seats 220; and Habima 4 (formerly known as Heineken) is wood panelled and seats 170.

Other theaters
 Solomon Stramer's Yiddish theater troupe in Cluj, Transylvania, Romania in the 1920s was also called Habimah.
 (Emanuel Levy, The Habima: Israel's National Theater. Columbia University Press, 1979).

See also
List of Israel Prize recipients

References

 Levy, Emanuel. The Habima, 1917-1977: A Study of Cultural Nationalism.  Columbia University Press, 1979.

External links 

Official site
The tale of habima

Theatres in Tel Aviv
Theatre companies in Israel
National theatres
Jewish theatres
Israel Prize in theatre recipients
Israel Prize recipients that are organizations
Arts organizations established in 1918
1918 establishments in British-administered Palestine
Culture in Tel Aviv
Tourist attractions in Tel Aviv